Jordan Gysberts (born 11 June 1991) is an Australian rules footballer who previously played for the Melbourne Football Club and the North Melbourne Football Club in Australian Football League (AFL).

Junior career
Gysberts played his junior football with the Eastern Ranges in the TAC Cup and for Yarra Valley Grammar, where he played as an inside midfielder with good kicking skills. Gysberts also represented the Vic Metro side in the 2008 and 2009 NAB AFL Under-18 Championships and averaged 23 disposals a game in the TAC Cup in 2009 for the Eastern Ranges.

Gysberts was named best on ground for the AFL/AIS Under 18 team during its 2009 Cape Town match against the South Africa national Australian rules football team.

AFL career
Gysberts was drafted by the Melbourne Football Club in the 2009 AFL National Draft with the 11th overall selection, which Melbourne received in return for trading Brock McLean to the Carlton Football Club. Gysberts was given Brock McLean's number 5 guernsey, which was presented to him by former Melbourne legend Gerard Healy.

After a series of good performances for Melbourne's , the Casey Scorpions, Gysberts was selected by the Melbourne match committee to debut against the Geelong Football Club in Round 10 of the 2010 AFL Season. In an impressive debut, Gysberts amassed 26 disposals for the game, the most of any Melbourne player, and was named as one of Melbourne's best players, in what was a comprehensive victory for Geelong. Gysberts repeated the effort of leading Melbourne's possessions in his second game, with 27 overall and also recording four clearances, for which he was awarded a Rising Star nomination, becoming the third Melbourne player, after Jack Trengove and Tom Scully, to be nominated for the Rising Star in 2010. Gysberts was again nominated for the Rising Star award after his Round 11, 2011 match against Essendon.

At the end of the 2012 season, Gysberts was traded to the North Melbourne Football Club with the 63rd pick in that draft, in exchange for Cameron Pedersen and the 74th pick.

At the end of the 2013 season, Gysberts was delisted by North Melbourne Football Club.

References

External links

1991 births
Living people
Melbourne Football Club players
Australian rules footballers from Victoria (Australia)
Eastern Ranges players
Casey Demons players
Werribee Football Club players